Antonino Catalano (3 July 1932 – 20 April 1987) was an Italian racing cyclist. He won stage 8 of the 1959 Giro d'Italia.

References

External links
 

1932 births
1987 deaths
Italian male cyclists
Italian Giro d'Italia stage winners
Place of birth missing
Sportspeople from Palermo
Cyclists from Sicily